The Bacon County Courthouse is a historic county courthouse on Main Street in Alma, Bacon County, Georgia. It was designed by architect J. J. Baldwin and completed in 1920. It was added to the National Register of Historic Places on September 18, 1980.  The Rabinowitz Building was temporally used as the courthouse.

According to its National Register nomination, the courthouse is one of only two in Georgia whose main entrances face the corner of a block. The other is the Morgan County Courthouse in Madison, Georgia.

See also
 National Register of Historic Places listings in Bacon County, Georgia

References

External links
 

County courthouses in Georgia (U.S. state)
Courthouses on the National Register of Historic Places in Georgia (U.S. state)
Government buildings completed in 1920
Buildings and structures in Bacon County, Georgia
National Register of Historic Places in Bacon County, Georgia